Climacium is a genus of mosses belonging to the family Climaciaceae. The species of this genus are found in Eurasia, North America, and Australia.

Species
The following species are recognised in the genus Climacium:
 Climacium acuminatum Warnst.
 Climacium americanum Brid.
 Climacium dendroides Weber & D.Mohr, 1804
 Climacium japonicum Lindb.

References

Hypnales
Moss genera